A.T.L. 2 (A-Town Legends 2) is a collaborative studio album by American rappers Pastor Troy, Khujo and T-Mo. It was released on July 22, 2008 via Siccness.net, serving as a sequel to Troy's A.T.L. (A-Town Legend). The album peaked at number 73 on the Top R&B/Hip-Hop Albums.

Track listing

Charts

References 

2008 albums
Sequel albums
Pastor Troy albums
Collaborative albums